Roy Mannion (born 1968) is an Irish former hurler who played as a right wing-back for the Offaly senior team.

Born in Banagher, County Offaly, Mannion first played competitive hurling in his youth. He first came to prominence on the inter-county scene when he first linked up with the Offaly minor team, before later joining the under-21 side. He made his senior debut during the 1988-89 National League and immediately became a regular member of the team. During his career Mannion won two Leinster medals and one National Hurling League medal.

At club level Mannion is a one-time Leinster medallist with St Rynagh's. In addition to this he also won four championship medals.

His retirement came during the 1997 championship.

In retirement from playing, Mannion became involved in team management and coaching. He served as a selector with the Offaly minor team for two seasons.

Honours

Team
St Rynagh's
Leinster Senior Club Hurling Championship (1): 1993
Offaly Senior Club Hurling Championship (4): 1987, 1990, 1992 1993

Offaly
Leinster Senior Hurling Championship (1): 1989, 1990  
National Hurling League (1): 1990-91
Leinster Under-21 Hurling Championship (1): 1989
All-Ireland Minor Hurling Championship (2): 1987, 1986
Leinster Minor Hurling Championship (2): 1986

References

1968 births
Living people
St Rynagh's hurlers
Offaly inter-county hurlers
Hurling selectors